Sphaeroderus nitidicollis is a species of ground beetle in the family Carabidae. It is found in North America.

Subspecies
These three subspecies belong to the species Sphaeroderus nitidicollis:
 Sphaeroderus nitidicollis brevoorti LeConte, 1847
 Sphaeroderus nitidicollis nitidicollis Guérin-Ménéville, 1829
 Sphaeroderus nitidicollis schaumii Chaudoir, 1861

References

Further reading

 

Carabinae
Articles created by Qbugbot
Beetles described in 1829